Mohd Fairuzi Mat Desa is a Malaysia professional football referee.

Career
In 2015, Fairuzi started his career as a professional referee.

He made his officiate debut in Premier League matches, between Kedah and KL SPA Putrajaya on 6 February 2016, with results end with a 5–1 win for Kedah.

References 

Living people
Malaysian football referees
Year of birth missing (living people)